Mount Jefferson State Natural Area is a  North Carolina state park in Ashe County, North Carolina in the United States. Located near Jefferson, North Carolina, it includes the peak of Mount Jefferson, named for Thomas Jefferson and his father Peter, who owned land nearby and surveyed the North Carolina-Virginia border in 1749. In 1974, Mount Jefferson State Natural Area was designated as a National Natural Landmark by the National Park Service.

History
In 1939 the Works Progress Administration created a road enabling widespread access to Mount Jefferson, which at the time had no official name and was primarily referenced to as Panther Mountain, likely due to a local legend of a panther once eating a child there. By 1956, their efforts yielded a  donation and raised enough funds to buy an additional  for the park. As a result, Mount Jefferson received its official name and became a state park in October 1956.

Tourist information
The park has one main road that leads to the peak of Mount Jefferson. On the way up are three overlooks; the Sunset Overlook, the Sunrise Overlook, and the Jefferson Overlook, as well as five hiking trails and a picnic shelter at the top. From the picnic shelter begins the Summit Trail, a  that leads to the  Rhodedendron Trail loop. At the end of the loop lies a short trail to the scenic Luther Rock, as well as the entrances to the  Lost Province Trail loop. Park hours are limited by inclement weather, but otherwise open every day until sunset during the year with the exception of Christmas Day. The , one-way Mountain Ridge Trail, which ascends to the peak of the mountain and through each overlook, may be accessed at the first park gate across from the park office during inclement weather, though caution is advised.

Nearby state parks
The following state parks are within  of Mount Jefferson State Natural Area:
Elk Knob State Park
Grandfather Mountain State Park
Grayson Highlands State Park, Virginia
New River State Park
Rendezvous Mountain State Park
Stone Mountain State Park

See also
Mount Jefferson
Jefferson, North Carolina

References

External links
 

National Natural Landmarks in North Carolina
State parks of North Carolina
State parks of the Appalachians
Protected areas established in 1956
Works Progress Administration in North Carolina
Protected areas of Ashe County, North Carolina